Dawson County is a county located in the north-central portion of the U.S. state of Georgia. As of the 2020 census, the population was 26,798 up from 22,330 in 2010. The county seat is Dawsonville.

Dawson County is included in the Atlanta-Sandy Springs-Roswell, Georgia Metropolitan Statistical Area. Its natural resources include Amicalola Falls, the highest falls in Georgia and one of the Seven Natural Wonders of the state.

History
Dawson County was created on December 3, 1857, from Gilmer and Lumpkin Counties. It is named for William Crosby Dawson, a U.S. Senator from Georgia.

Civil War
The 1860s brought war and hardships to the people of Dawson County. Many men of Dawson County answered the call and went to fight in the Civil War. Several Confederate units were raised in Dawson County, including:
21st Regiment, Georgia Infantry, Company E Concord Rangers
22nd Regiment, Georgia Infantry, Company I, Dawson County Independents
38th Regiment, Georgia Infantry, Company I (Wright's Legion), Dawson Farmers
38th Regiment, Georgia Infantry, Company L (Wright's Legion)
52nd Regiment, Georgia Volunteer Infantry, Company I

The 1st Georgia Infantry Battalion (Union), Companies B and C also was raised there.

After Civil War to present

The county is known in its long  involvement in auto racing, which was established in the 20th century; many of the original NASCAR racers came from this area. Local racing skills are said to have been developed by men who ran moonshine down Georgia State Route 9, also known as Thunder Road, to Atlanta. Celebrations of Dawson County's history and of its "likker" involvement occur every October with the Moonshine Festival.

Locals have referred to Dawson County as the Moonshine Capital of the World. This title is claimed by many other areas, but is fiercely defended by residents of this area. They took advantage of its relative isolation and the ability to move so much moonshine to the larger cities, especially Atlanta, during the Prohibition era.

Education 

Dawson County currently serves grades K-12. It has a total of seven schools - one for pre-K, four for grades K-5, one for grades 6–7, one for grades 8–9, and Dawson County High School (grades 10–12).

Geography 

The county is located in the foothills of the Blue Ridge Mountains. Portions of the mountain chain extend into the far northern and western portions of the county, with elevations around 3,500 ft. in this area.

Part of Lake Lanier is in the southeastern part of the county and the boundary lines with neighboring counties pass through the lake. The 729-ft (222-m) Amicalola Falls, are located in the county. The Amicalola Falls are the highest in Georgia, the tallest cascading waterfall east of the Mississippi River, and one of the Seven Natural Wonders of Georgia. The Chestatee and Etowah Rivers flow through Dawson County.

The vast majority of Dawson County is located in the Etowah River subbasin of the ACT River Basin (Coosa-Tallapoosa River Basin).  The southeastern tip of the county is located in the Upper Chattahoochee River subbasin of the  Apalachicola-Chattahoochee-Flint River Basin, and a very small northern section of Dawson County is located in the Coosawattee River subbasin of the larger ACT River Basin.

Adjacent counties
 Fannin County - north
 Lumpkin County - northeast
 Hall County - east
 Forsyth County - south
 Cherokee County - southwest
 Pickens County - west
 Gilmer County - northwest

National protected area
 Chattahoochee National Forest (part)

Transportation

Major highways
  U.S. Route 19
  State Route 9
  State Route 52
  State Route 53
  State Route 136
  State Route 183
  State Route 400

Pedestrians and cycling

 Springer Mountain Trail

Demographics

2000 census
As of the census of 2010,  22,330 people, and 10,425 households, and 6,390 families were living in the county. The racial makeup of the county was 95.62% White, 0.5% African American, 0.4% Native American, 0.6% Asian, 1.6% from other races, and 1.4% from two or more races. Hispanics or Latinos of any race were 4.1% of the population.

Of the 8,433 households, 21.9% had children under the age of 18 living with them, 61.7% were married couples living together, 9.5% had a female householder with no husband present, 4.6% had a male householder with no wife present, and 24.2% were not families. About 19.7% of all households were made up of individuals living alone, and 6.5% of whom were  65 years of age or older. The average household size was 2.61, and the average family size was 2.97.

In the county, the population was distributed as 5.7% under the age of 5, 6.5% at 5–9 years, 6.8% at 10–14 years, 6.0% at 15–19 years, 6.1% at 20–24 years, 5.7% at 25–29 years, 5.8% at 30–34 years, 6.6% at 35–39 years, 6.9% at 40–44 years, 8.1% at 45–49 years, 7.2% at 50–54 years, 7.0% at 55–59 years, 7.6% at 60–64 years, 6.0% at 65–69 years, 3.6% at 70–74 years, 2.4% at 75–79 years, 1.3% at 80–84 years, and 0.8% over age 85. The median age was 40.6 years - 11,164 were male and 11,166 were female.

The median income for a household in the county was estimated at $51,989, and for a family was estimated at $60,455. About 8.9% of families and 13.5% of the population were below the poverty line, including 16.0% of those under age 18 and 6.3% of those age 65 or over.

2010 census
As of the 2010 United States Census, there were 22,330 people, 8,433 households, and 6,390 families living in the county. The racial makeup of the county was 95.6% white, 0.6% Asian, 0.5% black or African American, 0.4% American Indian, 1.6% from other races, and 1.4% from two or more races. Those of Hispanic or Latino origin made up 4.1% of the population. In terms of ancestry, 18.9% were American, 18.8% were Irish, 14.7% were English, and 13.6% were German.

Of the 8,433 households, 33.0% had children under the age of 18 living with them, 61.7% were married couples living together, 9.5% had a female householder with no husband present, 24.2% were non-families, and 19.7% of all households were made up of individuals. The average household size was 2.61 and the average family size was 2.97. The median age was 40.6 years.

The median income for a household in the county was $51,128 and the median income for a family was $60,236. Males had a median income of $41,726 versus $31,978 for females. The per capita income for the county was $25,557. About 7.8% of families and 12.0% of the population were below the poverty line, including 16.0% of those under age 18 and 5.3% of those age 65 or over.

2020 census

As of the 2020 United States census, there were 26,798 people, 9,041 households, and 6,491 families residing in the county.

Communities

Cities
 Dawsonville

Unincorporated communities
 Juno
 Afton

Private communities
Several large, gated, private communities function similar to a municipality, providing many municipal-type services that operate independently of county government.

 Big Canoe

Politics
Dawson County is the only county in the country that supported Thomas Dewey in 1948 that then supported Adlai Stevenson II in 1952.

Notable people
 Bill Elliott - NASCAR racer, 1988 Cup Series champion, and Hall of Fame member
 Chase Elliott - NASCAR racer and 2014 NASCAR Xfinity Series champion, and 2020 NASCAR Cup Series champion
 Gober Sosebee - stock-car racer (three-time Daytona champion)
 Jerry Glanville - National Football League head coach, NASCAR driver
 Bill Goldberg - professional wrestler and actor (once resided in Dawson County)

See also

 National Register of Historic Places listings in Dawson County, Georgia
List of counties in Georgia

References

External links
 Archives of Dawson County, Roadside Georgia 
 Dawson County historical marker

 
Georgia (U.S. state) counties
1857 establishments in Georgia (U.S. state)
Dawson
Northeast Georgia
Counties of Appalachia
Populated places established in 1857